Mark Goldblatt is an Academy Award-nominated American film editor and film director and president emeritus of the American Cinema Editors.

Brooklyn born Goldblatt studied at the University of Wisconsin and London Film School, where his instructors included Mike Leigh, Clive Donner and Frank Clarke. Upon his return to the United States, Goldblatt observed Alfred Hitchcock on the set of one of his final films, Family Plot, and became a PA at Roger Corman's New World Pictures, where he worked with up-and-coming filmmakers including Joe Dante and Ron Howard. Corman's then-assistant, Gale Ann Hurd, connected Goldblatt with James Cameron, which led to their collaboration on mainstream hits including The Terminator, Terminator 2: Judgment Day (for which Goldblatt received an Oscar nomination), and True Lies. Lies led to collaborations with Jerry Bruckheimer and Michael Bay (Armageddon, Pearl Harbor, Bad Company, Bad Boys II) and Paul Verhoeven (Showgirls, Hollow Man and Starship Troopers). Goldblatt's additional credits include Rambo: First Blood Part II, Commando, Predator 2, X-Men: The Last Stand, Rise of the Planet of the Apes, Chappie, and Death Wish. He also directed The Punisher and Dead Heat.

Goldblatt describes the best part of being an editor as, "Being able to create something out of a given set of filmed material that seems to be greater than the sum of its parts. By this I mean subtext and grace and counterpoint of characters (and performances) that comes out of a dialectical montage."

He is a member and former vice president and president of the American Cinema Editors (or ACE Society) as well as a long-standing Board of Governors of the Academy of Motion Picture Arts and Sciences. In 2018, Goldblatt became an ACE Career Achievement Awards honoree.

He is the father of actor, director, and editor Max Goldblatt.

Filmography

Awards and nominations
Goldblatt is an Academy Award nominee for his work on Terminator 2: Judgment Day, a winner of Academy of Science Fiction, Fantasy & Horror Films' Saturn Award for Piranha (1978) and a Satellite Award for X-Men: The Last Stand, and was twice nominated for ACE's Eddie Award for his work on Terminator 2: Judgment Day and True Lies.

References

External links
 
 ACE- Members

Year of birth missing (living people)
Living people
American film editors
American Cinema Editors
American film directors
Alumni of the London Film School